Beri Kolon Forest Park, or Berikolon, is a forest park in the Gambia. Established on January 1, 1954, it covers 1052 hectares.

It is located in the Lower River Region in the Jarra Central District and Jarra East District, on the north side of South Bank Road, Gambia's main trunk road, around 15 miles east of the next larger town, Soma.

References
  

Protected areas established in 1954
Forest parks of the Gambia
1954 establishments in Africa